The following highways are numbered 25B:

United States
 County Road 25B (Alachua County, Florida)
 Nebraska Link 25B
 New Hampshire Route 25B
 New Jersey Route 25B (former)
 New York State Route 25B
 Vermont Route 25B